Everett Township, Nebraska may refer to the following places:

 Everett Township, Burt County, Nebraska
 Everett Township, Dodge County, Nebraska

See also
 Everett Township (disambiguation)

Nebraska township disambiguation pages